Riceboy Sleeps is a Canadian drama film, directed by Anthony Shim and released in 2022. Based in part on Shim's own childhood, the film centres on So-Young (Choi Seung-yoon), a Korean immigrant single mother raising her teenage son Dong-Hyun (Ethan Hwang) after moving to Canada to give him a better life.

The film was shot in fall 2021, primarily in the Greater Vancouver Area with some location shooting in South Korea. Shim shot the film primarily in long takes, avoiding the practice of shooting camera coverage or editing the scenes.

The film premiered in the Platform Prize program at the 2022 Toronto International Film Festival on September 11, 2022, and was named the winner of the program's award on September 18. It had its international premiere at the 27th Busan International Film Festival in October 2022.

Critical response
Allan Hunter of Screen Daily wrote that the film "could almost be a companion piece to Lee Isaac Chung's Minari", and wrote that Shim "displays a sensitivity to the characters and the situations in which they find themselves. He never judges and Christopher Lew’s gently roving camerawork and single takes invite the viewer to lean in, observe and take stock of all the emotions at play. The changing aspect ratios (Canadian sequences are shot in 4:3) also reflect the confinement and openness of the different countries. And he is well served by his cast, with an impressive So-young capturing the determination and fortitude of a character who puts everything into giving her son a new and better life."

The film was named to TIFF's annual year-end Canada's Top Ten list for 2022.

Awards

References

External links 
 

2022 films
2022 drama films
Canadian drama films
Films about Korean Canadians
2020s Canadian films